Dubravka Ugrešić (27 March 1949 – 17 March 2023) was a Yugoslav, Croatian and Dutch writer. A graduate of University of Zagreb, she was based in Amsterdam since 1996; she was identified as a Yugoslav writer.

Early life and education
Ugrešić was born on 27 March 1949 in Kutina, Yugoslavia (now Croatia). She was born into an ethnically mixed family; her mother was an ethnic Bulgarian from Varna. She majored in comparative literature and Russian language at the University of Zagreb's Faculty of Arts, pursuing parallel careers as a scholar and as a writer. After graduation, she continued to work at the university, at the Institute for Theory of Literature. In 1993, she left Croatia for political reasons. She spent time teaching at European and American universities, including UNC-Chapel Hill, UCLA, Harvard University, Wesleyan University, and Columbia University. She was based in Amsterdam where she was a freelance writer and contributor to several American and European literary magazines and newspapers.

Writing

Novels and short stories

Dubravka Ugrešić published novels and short story collections. Her novella Steffie Speck in the Jaws of Life was published in 1981. Filled with references to works of both high literature (by authors such as Gustave Flaubert and Bohumil Hrabal) and trivial genres (such as romance novels and chick lit), it represents a sophisticated and lighthearted postmodern play with the traditional concept of the novel. It follows a young typist named Steffie Speck, whose name was taken from a Dear Abby column, as she searches for love, both parodying and being compelled by the kitschy elements of romance. The novel was made into a successful 1984 Yugoslav film In the Jaws of Life, directed by Rajko Grlić.

Regarding her writing, Ugrešić remarked:

Her novel Fording the Stream of Consciousness received the NIN Award in 1988, the highest literary honor in former Yugoslavia, whose winners include Danilo Kiš and Milorad Pavić; Ugrešić was the first woman to be awarded the prize. The novel is Bulgakov-like "thriller" about an international "family of writers" who gather at a conference in Zagreb during Yugoslavian times. Museum of Unconditional Surrender is a novel about the melancholy of remembrance and forgetting. A female narrator, an exile, surrounded by scenery of post-Wall Berlin and images of her war-torn country Yugoslavia, constantly changes the time zones of her life, past and present.

Set in Amsterdam, Ministry of Pain portrays the lives of displaced people. In the novel Baba Yaga Laid An Egg, published in the Canongate Myth Series. Ugrešić drew on the Slavic mythological figure of Baba Yaga to tell a modern fairy tale. It concerns societal gender inequalities and discrimination.

Essays

Ugrešić’s “creative work resists reduction to simplified, isolated interpretative models”.  

Her collection Have A Nice Day: From the Balkan War to the American Dream consists of short dictionary-like essays on American everyday existence, seen through the lenses of a visitor whose country is falling apart. The Culture of Lies is a volume of essays on ordinary lives in a time of war, nationalism and collective paranoia. "Her writing attacks the savage stupidities of war, punctures the macho heroism that surrounds it, and plumbs the depths of the pain and pathos of exile" according to Richard Byrne of Common Review. Thank You For Not Reading is a collection of essays on literary trivia: the publishing industry, literature, culture and the place of writing.

Ugrešić received several major awards for her essays, including Charles Veillon Prize, Heinrich Mann Prize, Jean Amery Prize. In the United States, Karaoke Culture was shortlisted for National Book Critic Circle Award.

Other writings

Dubravka Ugrešić was also a literary scholar who published articles on Russian avant-garde literature, and a scholarly book on Russian contemporary fiction Nova ruska proza (New Russian Fiction, 1980). She edited anthologies, such as Pljuska u ruci (A Slap in the Hand), co-edited nine volumes of Pojmovnik ruske avangarde (Glossary of Russian avant-garde), and translated writers such as Boris Pilnyak and Daniil Kharms (from Russian into Croatian). She was also the author of three books for children.

Politics and exile 

At the outbreak of the war in 1991 in former Yugoslavia, Ugrešić took a firm anti-war and anti-nationalist stand. She wrote critically about nationalism, the stupidity and the criminality of war, and soon became a target of parts of the Croatian media, fellow writers and public figures. She had been accused of anti-patriotism and proclaimed a "traitor", a "public enemy" and a "witch". She left Croatia in 1993 after a long-lasting series of public attacks, and because she “could not adapt to the permanent terror of lies in public, political, cultural, and everyday life”. She wrote about her experience of collective nationalist hysteria in her book The Culture of Lies, and described her "personal case" in the essay The Question of Perspective (Karaoke Culture). She continued to write about the dark sides of modern societies, about the "homogenization" of people induced by media, politics, religion, common beliefs and the marketplace (Europe in Sepia). Being "the citizen of a ruin" she was interested in the complexity of a "condition called exile" (J. Brodsky). Her novels (Ministry of Pain, The Museum of Unconditional Surrender) explore exile traumas, but also the excitement of exile freedom. Her essay Writer in Exile (in Thank You for Not Reading) is a small writer's guide to exile. She described herself as "post-Yugoslav, transnational, or, even more precisely, postnational".

In 2017, she signed the Declaration on the Common Language of the Croats, Serbs, Bosniaks and Montenegrins.

Literary awards 
1988 – NIN Award (Annual prize for Best New Yugoslav Novel) (Yugoslavia)
1996 – Prix européen de l'essai Charles Veillon (Annual prize for Best European Book of Essays) (Switzerland)
1997 – Verzetsprijs 1997, Stichting Kunstenaarsverzet 1942–1945 (Artists in Resistance Prize) (Netherlands)
1998 – SWF-Bestenliste Literaturpreis (Sud-West-Funk Bestlist Literary Award) (Germany)
1998 – Austrian State Prize for European Literature (Austria)
2000 – Heinrich Mann Prize. Akademie Der Kunste Berlin (Germany)
2004 – Premio Feronia-Città di Fiano (Italy)
2006 – Shortlisted for the Independent Foreign Fiction Prize (UK)
2009 – Nominated for the Man Booker International Prize (UK)
2010 – James Tiptree Jr. Award for Baba Yaga Laid an Egg (US)
2011 – Finalist of the National Book Critics Circle Awards (in the Criticism category, for Karaoke Culture: Essays) (USA)
2012 – Jean-Améry-Prize for European Essays (Austria/Germany)
2016 – Neustadt International Prize for Literature (US)
2016 – Vilenica International Literary Festival Prize (Slovenia)

Selected bibliography in English translation

In the Jaws of Life (1981). Trans. Celia Hawkesworth and Michael Henry Heim (Virago, 1992)
Republished as In the Jaws of Life and Other Stories (Northwestern University Press, 1993), compiling the novella Steffie Cvek in the Jaws of Life, the short story collection Life Is a Fairy Tale (1983), as well as "A Love Story" (from the 1978 short story collection Poza za prozu) and "The Kharms Case" (1987).
Republished again as Lend Me Your Character (Dalkey Archive, 2005), translation revised by Damion Searls, and compiling the novella Steffie Cvek in the Jaws of Life, the short story collection Life Is a Fairy Tale (1983), and "The Kharms Case" (1987).
Fording the Stream of Consciousness (1988). Trans. Michael Henry Heim (Virago, 1991; Northwestern University Press, 1993)
American Fictionary (1993). Trans. Celia Hawkesworth and Ellen Elias-Bursác (Open Letter, 2018)
Revised translation of Have a Nice Day: From the Balkan War to the American Dream. Trans. Celia Hawkesworth (Jonathan Cape, 1994; Viking, 1995)
The Culture of Lies (1996). Trans. Celia Hawkesworth (Weidenfeld and Nicolson, 1998; Penn State University Press, 1998)
The Museum of Unconditional Surrender (1997). Trans. Celia Hawkesworth (Phoenix House, 1998; New Directions, 2002)
Thank You for Not Reading (2002). Trans. Celia Hawkesworth and Damion Searls (Dalkey Archive, 2003)
The Ministry of Pain (2004). Trans. Michael Henry Heim (SAQI, 2005; Ecco Press, 2006)
Nobody’s Home (2005). Trans. Ellen Elias-Bursác (Telegram/SAQI, 2007; Open Letter, 2008)
Baba Yaga Laid an Egg (2007). Trans. Ellen Elias-Bursác, Celia Hawkesworth and Mark Thompson (Canongate, 2009; Grove Press, 2010)
Karaoke Culture (2011). Trans. David Williams (Open Letter, 2011)
Europe in Sepia (2013). Trans. David Williams (Open Letter, 2014)
Fox (2017). Trans. Ellen Elias-Bursać and David Williams (Open Letter, 2018)
The Age of Skin (2019). Trans. Ellen Elias-Bursać (Open Letter, 2020)

Notelist

References

Further reading

External links 

 
 Dubravka Ugrešić at the complete review
 Dubravka Ugrešić interview by Svetlana Boym in BOMB Magazine, 2002
 Ugrešić at Open Letter Books

1949 births
2023 deaths
People from Kutina
Heinrich Mann Prize winners
Postmodern writers
Croatian dissidents
Croatian expatriates in the Netherlands
Yugoslav women writers
Yugoslav writers
Croatian women writers
Croatian writers
University of Zagreb alumni
International Writing Program alumni
Signatories of the Declaration on the Common Language
Croatian women novelists
Croatian people of Bulgarian descent